HD 45350 is a solar analog star with an exoplanetary companion in the northern constellation of Auriga. It has an apparent visual magnitude of 7.89, which means it is an 8th magnitude star that is too dim to be readily visible to the naked eye. The system is located at a distance of 153 light-years from the Sun based on parallax measurements, but is drifting closer with a radial velocity of −21 km/s.

This is an ordinary G-type main-sequence star with a stellar classification of G5 V, which indicates it is generating energy through core hydrogen fusion. Age estimates are in the range of 6–7 billion years and it has an absolute magnitude of 4.45, placing it about 0.8 magnitudes above the main sequence. The star is chromospherically quiet but metal-rich with a projected rotational velocity of 4.7 km/s. The mass of the star is about the same as the Sun, but it is 24% larger in radius and is a radiating 43% higher luminosity.

The star HD 45350 is named Lucilinburhuc. The name was selected in the NameExoWorlds campaign by Luxembourg, during the 100th anniversary of the IAU. The Lucilinburhuc fortress was built in 963 by the founder of Luxembourg, Count Siegfried. The year 2019-2020 class of 3B from the Luxembourgish Echternach high school won the contest to name both the star and its planet.

Planetary system 
In January 2005, the discovery of a very eccentric extrasolar planet orbiting the star was announced by the California and Carnegie Planet Search team.

See also
 List of extrasolar planets

References

External links
 
 

G-type main-sequence stars
Solar analogs
Planetary systems with one confirmed planet

Auriga (constellation)
BD+39 1637
045350
030860